South Buffalo Creek is a  tributary of Buffalo Creek in Botetourt and Rockbridge counties in the U.S. state of Virginia. Via Buffalo Creek and the Maury River, it is part of the James River watershed.

See also
List of rivers of Virginia

References

USGS Hydrologic Unit Map - State of Virginia (1974)

Rivers of Virginia
Tributaries of the James River
Rivers of Botetourt County, Virginia
Rivers of Rockbridge County, Virginia